McCarville is a surname. Notable people with the surname include:

Janel McCarville (born 1982), American basketball player
Krista McCarville (born 1982), Canadian curler
Mike McCarville, Canadian curler

See also
McCarvill
Mac Cearbhaill, a Gaelic Irish clan